Alauddin Marri (born 28 February 1979) is a Pakistani businessman and social worker who served as caretaker Chief Minister of Balochistan, in office from 8 June 2018 to 19 August 2018.

Early life and education
He was born on 28 February 1979 in Quetta, Balochistan, Pakistan. He completed his early education from Tameer-i-Nau Public School and from the Tameer-i-Nau Public College in Quetta, and  graduated from the University of Balochistan.

He is from Mastung District of Balochistan, Pakistan and hails from Marri tribe.

Chief Ministership
He was recommended by the outgoing Balochistan government but consensus between opposition and government could not be reached and the matter to appoint him to the post was decided by the Election Commission of Pakistan on 7 June 2018.

References 

Chief Minister of Balochistan

Living people
Baloch people
People from Mastung District
1979 births
Chief Ministers of Balochistan, Pakistan
University of Balochistan alumni